Magoffin County Pioneer Village and Museum is museum in downtown Salyersville, Kentucky that exhibits a collection of reconstructed log buildings from, mostly, the eastern region of Kentucky. The Magoffin County Historical Society maintains a Library and Archives Center with a collection of genealogical and historical material at the site.

Most of the cabins displayed in the reconstructed village date back to the early 19th century. The structures use all original materials from the log buildings. The buildings are disassembled and then transported to the Pioneer Village for reassembly on site.

Gallery

References

External links

Magoffin County Historical Society

Salyersville, Kentucky
Open-air museums in Kentucky
Museums in Magoffin County, Kentucky
History museums in Kentucky
Log buildings and structures in Kentucky
Rebuilt buildings and structures in the United States